Montboudif is a commune in the Cantal department, south central France.

Geography
The river Rhue forms most of the commune's southern border.

Population

Personalities
It is the birthplace of Georges Pompidou (1911-1974), President of France from 1969 until his death.

See also
Communes of the Cantal department

References

Communes of Cantal